Ghar Ki Laaj is a 1960 Hindi film starring Feroz Khan, Nirupa Roy in lead roles. It was directed by V. M. Vyas.

Soundtrack

References

External links

1960 films
1960s Hindi-language films
Films scored by Ravi